Jyotii Sethi, is an Indian actress. She debuted in Telugu cinema with the film Where Is Vidya Balan, with Prince Cecil. 
She first gained recognition from Punjabi music video with Gippy Grewal, and a short film with Ammy Virk. 
She debuted in Bollywood with the film Phullu and her acting was highly appreciated by the critics.

Filmography

References

External links 

Year of birth missing (living people)
Living people
Indian film actresses